Companhia de Planejamento do Distrito Federal - CODEPLAN (Company of Planning of Federal District) is a company of the government of Federal District, Brazil, which is responsible for the actions of planning and development of that region.

At its creation, it was named "Companhia do Desenvolvimento do Planalto Central" and remained active until March 2, 2007, when it was renamed in the current form.

References 

Government agencies of Brazil
Companies based in Brasília
Government agencies established in 1964
Government-owned companies of Brazil
1964 establishments in Brazil